Mir Mahalleh (also Romanized as Mīr Maḩalleh; also known as Mīr Maḩal) is a village in Masal Rural District, in the Central District of Masal County, Gilan Province, Iran. At the 2006 census, its population was 390, in 114 families.

References 

Populated places in Masal County